Maksym Serhiyovych Havrylenko (born 18 August 1991) is a Ukrainian professional football midfielder who plays for Kramatorsk.

References

External links
 
 

1991 births
Living people
Footballers from Odesa
Ukrainian footballers
Association football midfielders
FC Chornomorets Odesa players
FC Chornomorets-2 Odesa players
FC Desna Chernihiv players
FC SKA Odesa players
FC Dnister Ovidiopol players
PFC Sumy players
FC Dacia Chișinău players
FC Dinamo-Auto Tiraspol players
FC Zhemchuzhyna Odesa players
FC Mynai players
FC Polissya Zhytomyr players
FC Kramatorsk players
Ukrainian First League players
Ukrainian Second League players
Moldovan Super Liga players
Ukrainian expatriate footballers
Expatriate footballers in Moldova
Ukrainian expatriate sportspeople in Moldova